The Imperial Order of the Iron Crown was one of the highest orders of merit in the Austrian Empire and Austria-Hungary until 1918. It was founded in 1815 by Emperor Franz I of Austria as a re-establishment of the original Order of the Iron Crown, which previously had been an order of the Napoleonic Kingdom of Italy.

The order had three classes and, until 1884, all classes conferred automatic hereditary ennoblement. The third class conferred the rank of Ritter, the second class conferred the rank of Baron, and the first class conferred the title of Privy Councillor, the style of Excellency and the right to attend court. According to the order's statutes, only a limited number of members throughout the empire were allowed at any given time. The maximum number of 1st class knights was 20, for the 2nd class it was 30 and for the 3rd class 50, limiting the total number of members to 100 at any given time.

History
The Holy Roman Empire, ruled by the Habsburg dynasty, gave way to the Empire of Austria between 1804 and 1806.  The last Holy Roman Emperor, Franz II, was proclaimed Emperor Franz I of Austria.  His daughter, the Archduchess Maria Louise, was Napoleon’s second wife and Empress Consort, and the mother of Napoleon’s only legitimate son and heir, Napoleon, Duke of Reichstadt.  With the collapse of Napoleon’s empire, Imperial Austria regained its traditional control of Lombardy as the Kingdom of Lombardy–Venetia.

The Austrian order was also divided into three distinct classes of knighthood, recognized as the First, Second, and Third Classes.  Investment of this order carried an Imperial patent of nobility.  With the collapse of the Austro-Hungarian Empire, in 1918, all but one (the Order of the Golden Fleece) of the chivalric orders of its monarchy were formally abolished.

Insignia
While the ribbon colors changed from the Imperial French gold and green to the Imperial Austrian gold and royal blue, the general look of the medal remained largely the same – an imperial eagle set within a representation of the Iron Crown of Lombardy.  Grand Cross (French) and First Class (Austrian) knights wore a sash and badge over the right shoulder, with an eight-pointed star (that featured the Iron Crown at its center) on the left breast. Imperial French knight commanders wore a traditional military style medal on the left chest, with the addition of a bow in the center of the ribbon to delineate them from ordinary knights. Imperial Austrian Second Class knights wore the medal suspended from a ribbon about the neck. French ordinary knights and Austrian Third Class knights wore a traditional military medal on the left chest.

From 1908 for First Class knights, and from 1917 for Second Class knights, the Imperial Austrian order allowed for an undress version to be worn with service dress. First Class knights were authorized to wear a Third Class military medal on the left breast, with an addition of a device known as a "Kleine Dekoration".  The pin device was a miniature version of the First Class breast star, and was worn on the center of the ribbon to delineate the wearer as a knight of the First Class.  Variations in the star matched the details of the knight's specific award: including the war decoration wreath and the crossed swords.  The Second Class Kleine Dekoration was a miniature depiction of the Iron Crown of Lombardy (copied from the lower part of the actual medal). As with the First Class knights, the Kleine Dekoration for the Second Class knights matched the award to the knights: crown only for peacetime award, crown encircled by a wreath for the war decoration, and topped with swords for those awards "with swords", and was worn in the same fashion as that of the First Class knights.

During World War I,  awards "with swords" were given to symbolize personal valour of the knight that led to his award.  Hence, ordinary knights medals were also frequently adorned with crossed swords, pinned to the tri-fold ribbon.

Notable recipients

Masters of the Order
 Franz I, Emperor of Austria, 1816–1835
 Ferdinand I, Emperor of Austria, 1835-1848
 Franz Josef I, Emperor of Austria-Hungary, 1848–1916
 Karl I, Emperor of Austria-Hungary, 1916–1918

Knights

 James Hamilton, 2nd Duke of Abercorn
 Giuseppe Acerbi
 Alois Lexa von Aehrenthal
 Hasan bey Agalarov
 Archduke Albrecht Franz, Duke of Teschen
 Alfred, 2nd Prince of Montenuovo
 Augusto Carlos Teixeira de Aragão
 Count Kasimir Felix Badeni
 Ferdinand von Bauer
 Heinrich von Bellegarde
 Johannes Benk
 Leon Biliński
 Josef Bílý
 Friedrich Wilhelm von Bismarck
 Herbert von Bismarck
 Otto von Bismarck
 Wilhelm von Bismarck
 Fedor von Bock
 Eduard von Böhm-Ermolli
 Walther Bronsart von Schellendorff
 Bruno, Prince of Ysenburg and Büdingen
 Adolf von Brudermann
 Rudolf von Brudermann
 Bernhard von Bülow
 Karl von Bülow
 Artur Maximilian von Bylandt-Rheidt
 Leo von Caprivi
 Eduard Clam-Gallas
 Count Manfred von Clary-Aldringen
 Prince Siegfried von Clary-Aldringen
 Cevat Çobanlı
 Franz Conrad von Hötzendorf
 Anton Csorich
 Karl von Czyhlarz
 Maximilian Daublebsky von Sterneck
 Adolf von Deines
 Rudolf von Delbrück
 Georg Dragičević
 Ludwig Draxler
 Carl August Ehrensvärd (1858–1944)
 Josef Fanderlik
 Géza Fejérváry
 Ferdinand III, Grand Duke of Tuscany
 Emanuel Salomon Friedberg-Mírohorský
 Ventura García-Sancho, Marquess of Aguilar de Campoo
 Agenor Maria Gołuchowski
 Heinrich von Gossler
 Karl von Habsburg
 Otto von Habsburg
 Wilhelm von Hahnke
 Anton Haus
 Alajos Hauszmann
 Karl Eberhard Herwarth von Bittenfeld
 Miklós Horthy
 Archduke Hubert Salvator of Austria
 Dietrich von Hülsen-Haeseler
 Karl Georg Huyn
 Itō Hirobumi
 Ányos Jedlik
 Archduke Joseph August of Austria
 Archduke Joseph Ferdinand of Austria
 Georg von Kameke
 Gustav von Kessel
 Karl Graf von Kirchbach auf Lauterbach
 Anton Klodič von Sabladoski
 Eduard von Knorr
 Hans von Koester
 Alexander von Koller
 Prince Konrad of Bavaria
 Hermann Kövess von Kövessháza
 Franz Kuhn von Kuhnenfeld
 Auguste, Baron Lambermont
 Franciszek Latinik
 Ernst Lauda
 Archduke Leopold Salvator of Austria
 Joseph Maximilian von Maillinger
 Ferdinand von Malaisé
 Edwin Freiherr von Manteuffel
 Jan Matejko
 Gabriel Jean Joseph Molitor
 Helmuth von Moltke the Younger
 Rudolf Montecuccoli
 Georg Alexander von Müller
 Miroslav Navratil
 Nicholas I of Montenegro
 Maximilian Njegovan
 Laval Nugent von Westmeath
 Alexander August Wilhelm von Pape
 Thorleif Paus
 Archduke Peter Ferdinand of Austria
 Karl von Pflanzer-Baltin
 Hans von Plessen
 Ferdinand von Quast
 Joseph Radetzky von Radetz
 Antoni Wilhelm Radziwiłł
 Wilhelm von Ramming
 Manfred von Richthofen
 Sándor Farkas de Boldogfa
 Prince William of Schaumburg-Lippe
 Alfred von Schlieffen
 Emil von Schlitz
 Eberhard Graf von Schmettow
 Friedrich von Scholl
 August Schwendenwein von Lanauberg
 Hans von Seeckt
 Gustav von Senden-Bibran
 Stanisław Smolka
 Hermann von Spaun
 Philipp von Stadion und Thannhausen
 Rudolf Stöger-Steiner von Steinstätten
 Stanisław Szeptycki
 Sándor Szurmay
 Ludwig Freiherr von und zu der Tann-Rathsamhausen
 Myron Tarnavsky
 Karl Tersztyánszky von Nádas
 Tewfik Pasha
 Georg von Trapp
 Fyodor Trepov (senior)
 Aymard d'Ursel
 Illarion Vorontsov-Dashkov
 Karl von Wedel
 Ludwig von Welden
 Karl Weyprecht
 Duke William of Württemberg
 Constantin von Wurzbach
 Yamagata Aritomo
 Arthur Zimmermann
 August zu Eulenburg

See also
 Order of chivalry
 Order of St. George (Habsburg-Lorraine)
 Orders, decorations, and medals of Austria-Hungary

Sources
 Blom, Philipp.  To Have and to Hold: An Intimate History of Collectors and Collecting.  Overlook, 2003.  pp. 146–147.
 Gottschalck, Friedrich.  Almanach der Ritter-Orden.  Leipzig, Kingdom of Saxony: Georg Joachim Goeschen, 1819.
  Austrian Biographical Encyclopaedia and Biographical Documentation

References

Iron Crown, Order of the
Orders, decorations, and medals of Austria-Hungary
1815 establishments in the Austrian Empire
Military awards and decorations of Austria-Hungary
 5
Francis II, Holy Roman Emperor